The David Davis Mansion, also known as Clover Lawn, is a Guilded Age home in Bloomington, Illinois that was the residence of David Davis, Supreme Court justice (1862–1877) and Senator from Illinois. The mansion has been a state museum since 1960.  It was added to the National Register of Historic Places in 1972 and was designated a National Historic Landmark in 1975. 
In celebration of the 2018 Illinois Bicentennial, David Davis Mansion was selected as one of the Illinois 200 Great Places  by the American Institute of Architects Illinois component (AIA Illinois).

Set in a residential neighborhood on Bloomington's near-south-side, the three-story yellow brick mansion comprises 36 rooms in an Italianate villa style.
The mansion's lot includes an 1872 wood house, a barn and stable, privies, a foaling shed, carriage barn, and a flower and ornamental cutting garden. "Sarah's Garden", the Victorian cut flower garden, with original heirloom roses and perennials began restoration in 2001.

History
Clover Lawn was built between 1870 and 1872 and is where Justice Davis lived until his death in 1886. Davis commissioned French-born architect Alfred H. Piquenard to design the mansion, which combines Italianate and Second Empire architectural features and is a model of mid-Victorian style and taste. Piquenard was a prominent Midwest architect who designed the State Capitol in Springfield. The home was meant as a residence for Davis' wife, Sarah. David Davis himself spent most of his time there after his retirement from the U.S. Senate in 1883. The house remained in the Davis family until 1960, when it was donated to the state of Illinois, which operates it as a state historic site.

Tours

The home is open to the general public from Wednesday through Saturday. The home hosts many seasonal events including "The Glorious Garden Festival", "Christmas at the Mansions", "A Guilded Age Christmas", and several antique car shows. During the winter holiday season the mansion is lavishly decorated for the Christmas holiday.

References

Further reading
Keene, John T. David Davis Mansion, National Register of Historic Places Inventory - Nomination Form, December 15, 1971, HAARGIS Database, Illinois Historic Preservation Agency, accessed August 31, 2008.

External links

David Davis Mansion - official site
Illinois State Preservation Agency: David Davis Mansion
David Davis Mansion, Property Information Report, Illinois Historic Preservation Agency, accessed August 31, 2008.
Illinois Great Places - David Davis Mansion
Society of Architectural Historians SAH ARCHIPEDIA entry on the David Davis Mansion

National Register of Historic Places in McLean County, Illinois
Buildings and structures in Bloomington–Normal
Houses in McLean County, Illinois
National Historic Landmarks in Illinois
Historic house museums in Illinois
Illinois State Historic Sites
Museums in McLean County, Illinois
Abraham Lincoln National Heritage Area
Tourist attractions in Bloomington–Normal
Houses completed in 1872
Houses on the National Register of Historic Places in Illinois
Italianate architecture in Illinois
Victorian architecture in Illinois
1872 establishments in Illinois